Fiona Afoma Amuzie-Iredu  is a Nigerian model, psychologist, voice -over artist and TV host. She is the winner of the Most Beautiful Girl in Nigeria (MBGN) 2010 pageant and the Nigeria contestant at the Miss World 2010. She is from Anambra state.

Background and education 
She hails from Abatete, Idemili-North LGA of Anambra state. She was nicknamed Ezenwanyi - which means queen in Igbo language - by her father.

She was a Microbiology undergraduate at the University of Jos when she contested at the Most Beautiful Girl in Nigeria pageant. She didn't complete her education at Jos but moved to the United Kingdom where she obtained a B.Sc in Psychology at the Coventry University.

Most Beautiful Girl in Nigeria 2010 
She was crowned Most Beautiful Girl in Nigeria for the year 2010 and represented Nigeria at the Miss World 2010 pageant.

Personal life 
She is married to Frank Iredu by traditional rites from Obosi, Anambra State on December 30, 2015 and by church wedding on January 2, 2016. She and her husband have one son and a daughter.

References 

Nigerian beauty pageant contestants
1991 births
Igbo people
 Miss World 2010 delegates
 living people
People from Anambra State